The Fletcher, later Boughey Baronetcy, of Newcastle-under-Lyme and of Betley both in the County of Stafford, is a title in the Baronetage of Great Britain. It was created on 24 August 1798 for Thomas Fletcher, of Betley Court, Staffordshire, High Sheriff of Staffordshire in 1783 and 1789 and Deputy Lieutenant of the county. He was the husband of Elizabeth Fenton, granddaughter of George Boughey, of Audley, Staffordshire whose will provided for his great-grandson (Fletcher's son John) to inherit the Audley estate.

In compliance with his great-grandfather's will the second Baronet assumed by sign-manual the surname of Boughey in 1805. He acquired an estate at Forton, Staffordshire where he rebuilt Aqualate Hall. He later sat as Member of Parliament for Newcastle-under-Lyme (1812) and Staffordshire (1820–23). He was succeeded by his eldest son, Thomas, the third Baronet, who was himself succeeded in turn by five of his eight sons, none of whom provided a male heir.

The eighth Baronet was succeeded by his first cousin once removed, George, the ninth Baronet. He was the son of Colonel George Fletcher Ottley Boughey, eldest son of Lieutenant-Colonel George Fenton Fletcher Boughey, third son of the second Baronet.

John Boughey (1845–1932), second son of George Fenton Fletcher Boughey, third son of the second Baronet, was a Major-General in the Wiltshire Regiment.

Fletcher, later Boughey baronets, of Newcastle-under-Lyme (1798)

Sir Thomas Fletcher, 1st Baronet (1747–1812)
Sir John Fenton Boughey, 2nd Baronet (1784–1823)
Sir Thomas Fletcher Fenton Boughey, 3rd Baronet (1809–1880). He served as High Sheriff of Staffordshire in 1832
Sir Thomas Fletcher Fenton Boughey, 4th Baronet (1836–1906). Son of the third Baronet, he was High Sheriff of Staffordshire in 1898. He died childless in 1906 and was succeeded by his younger brother, George, the fifth Baronet.
Reverend Sir George Boughey, 5th Baronet (1837–1910). Rector of Forton 1863–1908. He died without male issue in 1910 and was succeeded by his younger brother, William, the sixth Baronet
Sir William Fletcher Boughey 6th Baronet (1840–1912). A Commander in the Royal Navy. He died childless in 1912 and was succeeded by his younger brother, Robert, the seventh Baronet
Reverend Sir Robert Boughey, 7th Baronet (1843–1921). Vicar of Betley {1826–1921). He died unmarried in 1921 and was succeeded by his younger brother, Francis, the eighth Baronet
Sir Francis Boughey, 8th Baronet (1848–1927). Succeeded by his cousin.
Sir George Menteth Boughey, CBE, 9th Baronet (1879–1959). He was in the Indian Civil Service and served as Under-Secretary to the Government of the Punjab from 1912 to 1913. He was succeeded by his second but only surviving son, Richard, the tenth Baronet.
Sir Richard James Boughey, 10th Baronet (1925–1978). He was educated at Eton College and served in World War II as a lieutenant in the Coldstream Guards. His seat was at Ringmer Park, Ringmer, Sussex. He was High Sheriff of Sussex in 1964 and Deputy Lieutenant of the county. His second wife, Gillian Moubray, was sister-in-law to two Dukes, the Duke of Sutherland and the Duke of Richmond and Gordon.

 the title was held by his eldest son, John, the eleventh Baronet, who succeeded in 1978.

Sir John George Fletcher Boughey, 11th Baronet (born 1959). A medical practitioner, he lived in Andorra.

Notes

References
Kidd, Charles, Williamson, David (editors). Debrett's Peerage and Baronetage (1990 edition). New York: St Martin's Press, 1990, 
 The Baronetage of England  7th edition. John Debrett (1839) p 281

Baronetcies in the Baronetage of Great Britain
1798 establishments in Great Britain